Mikalay Asipovich (born 29 May 1986) is a Belarusian former professional footballer.

Honours
MTZ-RIPO Minsk
Belarusian Cup winner: 2007–08

External links

1986 births
Living people
People from Maladzyechna
Belarusian footballers
Association football defenders
Belarusian expatriate footballers
Expatriate footballers in Latvia
Belarus international footballers
FC Partizan Minsk players
Dinaburg FC players
FC Neman Grodno players
FC Shakhtyor Soligorsk players
FC Minsk players
FC Gorodeya players
FC Uzda players
Sportspeople from Minsk Region